The Grey School of Wizardry is a school of occult magic that draws heavily on the fiction of J.K. Rowling. Founded by former headmaster Oberon Zell-Ravenheart, it operates primarily online and as a non-profit educational institution in California. The school offers lessons in over 500 classes across 16 departments. Graduates receive a certificate of journeymanship in their chosen major after completing an apprenticeship.

History 
Before the school opened, the Grey Council was established in 2002 by Oberon Zell-Ravenheart as an advisory group to determine the curriculum. The Grey Council was composed of some two dozen authors, mystics, magicians and leaders of neopagan communities around the world, including Raymond Buckland, Raven Grimassi, Patricia Telesco, Frederic Lamond, Morning Glory Zell-Ravenheart, Donald Michael Kraig, Katlyn Breene, Robert Lee "Skip" Ellison, Jesse Wolf Hardin, Nicki Scully, Sam Webster, Trina Robbins, Ronald Hutton, Amber K, Ellen Evert Hopman, Luc Sala and Jeff McBride. The Grey Council worked through 2003 to produce a textbook—a grimoire—for the school, the Grimoire for the Apprentice Wizard (2004). This was followed by the Companion for the Apprentice Wizard in 2006.

The Grey School of Wizardry first opened on August 1, 2004. The school's motto is: Omnia vivunt, omnia inter se conexa (“Everything is alive; everything is interconnected” — Cicero). It is a nonprofit educational institute for children 11–17 years of age, and adults of any age. The name of the school may derive from the colors associated with the wizards in the J. R. R. Tolkien classic The Lord of the Rings and, in particular, with the appendix to the name of the protagonist Gandalf (the Grey). It was incorporated as a non-profit educational institution in California on March 14, 2004, and received a 501(c)(3) tax exemption from the Internal Revenue Service on September 27, 2007.

Curriculum 

The school provides a seven-year apprenticeship curriculum in wizardry. Faculty and students represent a wide variety of faiths, including Pagan, Christian, Jewish, Buddhist, Hindu, and Muslim.

More than 500 classes are offered in 16 color-coded departments. These are: Wizardry (indigo), Nature Studies (silver), Magickal Practice (gold), Psychic Arts (aqua), Healing (blue), Wortcunning/Herbalism (green), Divination (yellow), Performance Magics (orange), Alchemy & Magickal Sciences (red), Lifeways (pink), Beast Mastery (brown), Cosmology (violet), Mathemagicks (clear), Ceremonial Magic (white), Lore (grey), and Dark Arts (black). Although some classes address mythology and comparative religion, the school's grimoire (textbook of magic), Companion for the Apprentice Wizard, and the school's philosophy focus on secular exploration of the esoteric rather than spirituality.

The program was partially inspired by the fictitious "Hogwarts School of Witchcraft and Wizardry" from the Harry Potter novels by J. K. Rowling. the Grey School hosts four lodges for adults: Flames, Waters, Winds, and Stones, that are associated with the classical elements Fire, Water, Air, and Earth; the school also has one youth lodge, Psyche, which is associated with the fifth element. The Grey School also sponsors clubs, merits, challenges, awards, a monthly school magazine (“Grey Matters”), summer conclaves at the school's physical campus, and a virtual school on "Second Life" with student-run moots and weekly meetups.

The school offers a full apprenticeship program where upon completion apprentices receive a certificate of journeymanship in their chosen major. Course materials and exercises are provided by qualified faculty and guest lecturers. 
The Grey School's Magister Program removes the structure and level restrictions of the Apprenticeship program, allowing the student to choose nearly any class from any level of study in the school's course catalogue. 
 
In October of 2019, the Grey School acquired a physical campus in Whitehall, New York. The "Nine Acre Woods" Conclave Grounds and the "Highspire" Manor building are open to Apprentices and Magisters for physical classes and during the school's yearly conclaves. Special access by appointment can be given by the provost. 

According to neopagan author Isaac Bonewits, "The Grimoire collects in one book a library of wisdom about ceremonial native and Earth-centered magic, Paleo- and Neopagan religions, the obligations of the wise to protect the defenseless, great wizards and witches of the past and present, and more." Bonewits also asserts that the school presents an opportunity for males who are unsatisfied by the teachings of the modern Wicca movement.

References

Further reading

Books
 Zell-Ravenheart, Oberon - Grimoire for the Apprentice Wizard  (New Page Books, 2004)
 Bonewits, Isaac - The Pagan Man (Kensington Citadel Press, 2005) p. 84
 Zell-Ravenheart, Oberon - Companion for the Apprentice Wizard (New Page Books, 2006)
 Adler, Margot - Drawing Down the Moon: Witches, Druids, Goddess-Worshippers, and Other Pagans in America Today, (1979; revised and expanded 3rd edition Penguin Books, 2006) pp. 330, 334
 Ash “LeopardDancer”, DeKirk - Dragonlore  (New Page, 2006)
 Pesznecker, Susan “Moonwriter” - Gargoyles  (New Page, 2006)
 Moonoak, Luke - Radiant Circles (The Solantis Institute, 2010)
 Cusack, Carole - Invented Religions (Ashgate, 2010)

Magazines
 Prosser, Lee - Ghostvillage.com review Fate Magazine (March 19, 2004)
 Seth, Shalini - The Grey School of Wizardry Emirates Today in the UAE (Nov. 18, 2005).
 Night Sky, Michael & Anne Newkirk Niven - Oberon Zell: A Wizard’s Vision  (PanGaia Magazine #47) (Autumn 2007) pp. 22–28

Academic Papers
 Cusack, Carole M., Associate Professor, BA (Hons), MEd, PhD, Editor, Journal of Religious History - The Church of All Worlds and Pagan Ecotheology: Uncertain Boundaries and Unlimited Possibilities Studies in Religion A20, University of Sydney NSW 2006

Online Publications
 Zell-Ravenheart, Oberon - Esoteric Education: Restoring the Wonder 
 Beattie, Bill - Interview with Oberon Zell-Ravenheart Witchcraft Magazine (Australia) (May 18, 2005) 
 O’Gaea, Ashleen - Interview with Oberon Zell-Ravenheart Tapestry (Litha and Lammas issues, 2005) 
 Zell-Ravenheart, Oberon - The Grey School of Wizardry’s 1st Birthday Five Feathers Magazine (Sept. 2005) 
 Elson, Rebecca - Ten Questions with Oberon Zell-Ravenheart The Magical Buffet (issue 16) 
 Shadowlands, Harlequin - Interview with Oberon Zell-Ravenheart The Witches Codex, 
 Badb, Jillbe - Interview with a Living Pagan Icon The Druid’s Egg (Imbolg 2007) (Contributing Editor) 
 Pesznecker, Susan “Moonwriter” - Profile: The Grey School of Wizardry The Magical Buffet, March 2007. 
 Online Wizardry Recognized with a 501(c)(3) - Alternative Approaches.com (October 29, 2007) 
 Wind, Mabyn An Interview with Oberon Zell-Ravenheart - Penton (Dec. 2007) 
 Sffarlenn, Laneth - Wizards of Old and New, the Grey School is Calling For You!  The Witches’ Voice (February 11, 2008)  
 Zaman, Natalie - We’re Off to Meet a Wizard: The Wonderful Oberon Zell! Broomstix (Beltane 2008) 
 White, Peter M. - Oberon Zell-Ravenheart Interview The Witches’ Codex (Oct. 31, 2008) 
 Walmsley, Charlotte (at Cardiff University) - Welcome to the Grey School of Wizardry: Real Life Dumbledore's Harry Potter Haven The National Student (August 19, 2013)

External links
 Grey School of Wizardry Official Website

Educational institutions established in 2004
Distance education institutions based in the United States
2004 establishments in California
 Magical organizations